Ryszard Antoni Knosala (born 8 August 1949 in Opole) is a Polish engineer, professor of technical sciences and politician. He was the first Rector of the University of Applied Sciences in Nysa, starting from 5 October 2001. Knosala was elected to the Sejm on 25 September 2005, getting 9087 votes in 21 Opole district as a candidate from the Civic Platform list.

Knosala is the Chairman of Polish Society of Production Management.

Awards and recognition
 Honorary degree of doctor honoris causa of the Czestochowa University of Technology, 2019.
 Order of the Rebirth of Poland, 2000.
 Gold Cross of Merit, 1993.

Publications
Knosala published his works, as the only author or together with other scientists, at such renowned publishing houses as Polish Economic Publishing House (PWE), Elsevier or Springer. Selected publications include:

 Management Engineering. Production digitization - series of PWE books (in Polish) with 3 editions of research news: #1 (2019), #2 (2020), #3 (2021).
 Verification of the Method for Assessing Productivity, Taking into Account Logistical Processes in Manufacturing Companies, Springer, 2018.
 Production Engineering. Knowledge Compendium (in Polish), PWE, 2017.
 Evaluation of design alternatives in mechanical engineering, Elsevier, 1992.

See also
Members of Polish Sejm 2005-2007

External links
Ryszard Knosala - parliamentary page - includes declarations of interest, voting record, and transcripts of speeches.

References

Members of the Polish Sejm 2005–2007
Civic Platform politicians
1949 births
Living people